Kiều (Anglicisation: Kieu), is a Vietnamese surname and unisex given name.

Notable people with the surname include:

 Kiều Công Tiễn, Vietnamese general
 Kiều Công Hãn (died 967), Vietnamese general, grandson of Kiều Công Tiễn
 Kiều Thuận, Vietnamese general, younger brother of Kiều Công Hãn
 Kieu Chinh (born 1937), Vietnamese-American actress
 Kiều Hưng (born 1937), Vietnamese singer of Vietnamese revolutionary songs
 Catherine Kieu (born ), American criminal
 Lê Kiều Thiên Kim (born 1981), Vietnamese chess player
 Tien Kieu, Vietnamese-Australian physicist and politician

Notable people with the given name include:
 Lý Ngọc Kiều (1041–1113), Vietnamese princess
 Bằng Kiều (born 1973), Vietnamese male pop singer
 Chương Thị Kiều (born 1995), Vietnamese female footballer
 Hoang Kieu (Hoàng Kiều), Vietnamese-born American businessman

See also
 The Tale of Kieu, an 1820 Vietnamese epic poem, whose title refers to its main character Thúy Kiều

Vietnamese-language surnames